Trejgle  is a settlement in the administrative district of Gmina Krynki, within Sokółka County, Podlaskie Voivodeship, in north-eastern Poland, close to the border with Belarus. The climate is cold and temperate.

References

Trejgle